The 2007 European Speed Skating Championships were held on the outdoor artificial ice track Arena Ritten in Collalbo, Italy. The Championships were three-day allround events, with the skaters completing four distances before the final championship standings are determined based on the samalog system.

Live broadcasts from the Championships were shown on Nederland 1, NRK and Rai Tre/Rai Sport Sat, with highlights on Das Erste.

The two champions were both below 21 years of age; Sven Kramer won his first European gold medal, two years after winning silver in Thialf, while Czech Martina Sáblíková won the women's championship to become the first Czech to medal at a European championship, and also the youngest European women's champion. Kramer is the youngest European Champion since 1992.

Rules

All skaters were allowed to skate the first three distances; 12 skaters took part on the fourth distance. These were qualified by taking the standings on the longest of the first three distances, as well as the samalog standings after three distances, and comparing these lists as follows:

 Skaters among the top 12 on both lists were qualified.
 To make up a total of 12, skaters were then added in order of their best rank on either list. Samalog standings take precedence over longest-distance standings in the event of a tie.

Final standings

Men

The top six skaters from the 2006 Championships were all present.

A placing among the top 16 qualified the nation for the 2007 World Championships as well as the 2008 European Championships (where each federation is automatically entitled to one skater and any additional skaters are added to this quota, with a cap of four.)

Women

Anni Friesinger, five-time European Champion, withdrew to concentrate on the World Sprint Championships a week later.

At first, the Norwegian Skating Federation selected only Maren Haugli, but included Mari Hemmer and Hedvig Bjelkevik after protests from within the speed skating community. Bjelkevik later declined, citing the same reason as Friesinger.

The top seven skaters from the 2006 Championships were all present.

The top 14 have qualified their nation for the World Allround Championships. Skaters in the top 16 have given their nation an addition to the basis quota of one skater for the 2008 European Championships, with the quota capped at four skaters per nation.

Friday's events

The competitions began at 13:00 local time.

In the results list, previous European medallists are mentioned, as well as the top ten on each distance.

 500 m men

Kramer advanced 13 places from his performance at the 2006 European Championship, and gained 0.8 seconds on Fabris compared to last year's standings. Ervik lost nearly a second, while Bøkko lost half a second and Verheijen gained 0.3 seconds, all compared to the defending champion Fabris. The distance podium is the same as last year, but only Skobrev finished in the same position.

 500 m women

Abramova, Lobysheva, Pechstein and Wójcicka all finished in the same order as in Hamar last year, with Abramova gaining a few hundredths of a second. However, Wüst gains over 1.2 seconds on those three compared to last year's performance, where she finished 0.79 500 m-seconds behind Pechstein in the overall standings. Groenewold finishes 0.77 seconds behind Pechstein, gaining 0.13 on 2006.

 5000 m men

The previous outdoor world best, by Chad Hedrick from the 2005 World Single Distance Championships, was bettered by 9.96 seconds. Verheijen was the first to beat the record, in the 12th of the 15 pairs, before Kramer lowered it by a further four seconds in the 13th pair, recording nine of twelve laps below 30 seconds.

Saturday's events

The competitions began at 13:00 local time.

 1500 m women

Wüst and Abramova finished first and second once more, with exactly the same difference in samalog points, while defending champion Pechstein, whose best World Cup ranking is in the long distance cup, advanced to third place in the allround rankings despite recording a worse placing here than on the 500 metres.

 1500 m men

In the final pair, Kramer bettered his personal best by nearly two seconds, thus advancing to third place on the Adelskalender. The outdoor world best mark was lowered by nearly three seconds by Fabris, who pipped Kramer to the line in the final pair, but remains 0.72 seconds behind before the final distance tomorrow, where Kramer was world record holder.

 3000 m women

By winning the distance, 19-year-old Sáblíková advanced seven places in the overall standings, but still needed to beat Wüst by 14.05 seconds on the final 5,000 metres. On this distance, two-thirds the length, she beat Wüst by 4.09 seconds. Renate Groenewold finished second, also advancing seven places in the allround standings, after skating in the same pair as Sáblíková and leading until two laps remained.

Sunday's events

The competitions began at 12:00 local time.

5000 m women

Sáblíková skated in the fifth pair, and after distancing Groenewold by 10 seconds and bettering the world outdoor mark by seven seconds, she set Wüst the task of finishing in 7:12.49 to become European champion. This would be fifth place thus far. Wüst started well, and with five laps to go, she was 0.6 seconds behind Sáblíková, with a cushion of more than 2.5 seconds per lap. But with lap times steadily going upwards, the worst being 37.0 on the penultimate lap, she arrived 0.23 seconds too late to become European champion. Sáblíková thus became the first Czech to win a senior speed skating championship. Neither Pechstein nor Anschütz-Thoms managed to beat Groenewold on the distance, giving Groenewold the bronze medal. Thus, in Friesinger's absence, Germany failed to finish on the podium for the first time since 1974.

 10,000 m men

The outdoor world best mark was lowered twice during the race; first by Enrico Fabris in the fifth pair, who bettered the old record by four seconds on his way to leading the distance. Sven Kramer was thus required to skate 13:22.21 to win the championship; he kept well ahead of that, even skating the last two laps in times below 30 seconds, much faster than any other lap of the race. Verheijen also managed to beat Bøkko by 0.455 points (9.10 10,000 m-seconds) to take the bronze medal.

See also 
 2007 World Allround Speed Skating Championships

References and notes

European Championships
European Speed Skating Championships
European, 2007
European Speed Skating Championships, 2007
European Speed Skating Championships